Inău may refer to the following places in Romania:

 Inău, a village in the town of Târgu Lăpuș, Maramureș County
 Inău, a village in Someș-Odorhei Commune, Sălaj County
 Inău, a tributary of the Someș in Sălaj County
 Ineu Peak, a mountain peak in the Rodna Mountains

Other uses 
 Ika-6 na Utos, a 2016 Philippine television drama series broadcast by GMA Network